Middlesex is a borough in Middlesex County, New Jersey, United States. It is located within the Raritan Valley region. As of the 2020 United States census, the borough's population was 14,636, its highest decennial count ever and an increase of 1,001 (+7.3%) over the 13,635 enumerated at the 2010 census, which in turn reflected a decline of 82 (−0.6%) from the 13,717 counted at the 2000 census.

Middlesex was incorporated as a borough by an act of the New Jersey Legislature on April 9, 1913, from portions of Piscataway, based on the results of a referendum held on May 6, 1913. The borough was named after Middlesex, England.

History

The Harris Lane School was a one-room schoolhouse that was the oldest school in Middlesex County, dating back to its construction in the 1790s. The original Pierce School was known as the East Bound Brook School House and The Parker House was also used for education until it was converted into a two-family house. As the Borough grew new schools were constructed to accommodate many more students. Our Lady of Mt. Virgin School was the first parochial school built in 1954.

In 1905, the Lincoln section of Middlesex organized a volunteer fire company and that set the organization of four other fire companies in the Borough.

Middlesex was a portion of Piscataway Township, until May 6, 1913 when it was incorporated as a separate entity through the action of the state legislature and local referendum. George Harris was elected as the first mayor and the first borough council was elected at the same time. Two constables were the law enforcement officers and were soon assisted by five appointed marshals.

Uranium processing and aftermath

Geography
According to the United States Census Bureau, the borough had a total area of 3.51 square miles (9.09 km2), including 3.49 square miles (9.03 km2) of land and 0.02 square miles (0.06 km2) of water (0.63%).

Unincorporated communities, localities and place names located partially or completely within the borough include East Bound Brook and Lincoln.

The borough borders the Middlesex County municipalities of Dunellen and Piscataway Township in Middlesex County; and Bound Brook, Bridgewater Township, Green Brook Township and South Bound Brook in Somerset County.

Middlesex is in the central division of the Raritan Valley (a line of cities in central New Jersey), along with Dunellen, Bound Brook, and South Bound Brook.

Demographics

Census 2010

The Census Bureau's 2006–2010 American Community Survey showed that (in 2010 inflation-adjusted dollars) median household income was $80,338 (with a margin of error of +/− $7,790) and the median family income was $93,817 (+/− $13,746). Males had a median income of $55,248 (+/− $7,439) versus $46,447 (+/− $5,086) for females. The per capita income for the borough was $34,607 (+/− $3,321). About 0.6% of families and 2.1% of the population were below the poverty line, including 1.6% of those under age 18 and 4.6% of those age 65 or over.

Census 2000

As of the 2000 United States Census there were 13,717 people, 5,048 households, and 3,740 families residing in the borough. The population density was 3,921.1 people per square mile (1,513.2/km2). There were 5,130 housing units at an average density of 1,466.5 per square mile (565.9/km2). The racial makeup of the borough was 87.26% White, 3.36% African American, 0.13% Native American, 4.16% Asian, 0.02% Pacific Islander, 3.21% from other races, and 1.86% from two or more races. Hispanic or Latino of any race were 9.00% of the population.

There were 5,048 households, out of which 34.1% had children under the age of 18 living with them, 59.3% were married couples living together, 10.5% had a female householder with no husband present, and 25.9% were non-families. 21.7% of all households were made up of individuals, and 10.7% had someone living alone who was 65 years of age or older. The average household size was 2.71 and the average family size was 3.17.

In the borough the population was spread out, with 24.1% under the age of 18, 6.2% from 18 to 24, 32.3% from 25 to 44, 23.2% from 45 to 64, and 14.2% who were 65 years of age or older. The median age was 38 years. For every 100 females, there were 95.0 males. For every 100 females age 18 and over, there were 91.9 males.

The median income for a household in the borough was $60,723, and the median income for a family was $70,343. Males had a median income of $47,446 versus $34,232 for females. The per capita income for the borough was $27,834. About 2.4% of families and 3.6% of the population were below the poverty line, including 4.1% of those under age 18 and 2.3% of those age 65 or over.

Government

Local government
Middlesex is governed under the Borough form of New Jersey municipal government, which is used in 218 municipalities (of the 564) statewide, making it the most common form of government in New Jersey. The governing body is comprised of a Mayor and a Borough Council, with all positions elected at-large on a partisan basis as part of the November general election. A Mayor is elected directly by the voters to a four-year term of office. The Borough Council is comprised of six members elected to serve three-year terms on a staggered basis, with two seats coming up for election each year in a three-year cycle. The Borough form of government used by Middlesex is a "weak mayor / strong council" government in which council members act as the legislative body with the mayor presiding at meetings and voting only in the event of a tie. The mayor can veto ordinances subject to an override by a two-thirds majority vote of the council. The mayor makes committee and liaison assignments for council members, and most appointments are made by the mayor with the advice and consent of the council.

The seven-member governing body is empowered to enact local ordinances, to levy municipal taxes and conduct the affairs of the community. In almost all cases, it can review and approve the actions of other Middlesex Borough committees and agencies. The Mayor and Borough Council conduct all of their business during monthly meetings open to the public. All legislative powers of the Borough are exercised by the Mayor and Council. These powers can take the form of a resolution, ordinance or proclamation.

, the Mayor of Middlesex is Republican John L. Madden, whose term of office ends December 31, 2023. Members of the Middlesex Borough Council are Council President James Eodice (R, 2022), Jeremiah A. Carnes (R, 2022), Michael Conahan (R, 2023; appointed to serve an unexpired term), John "Jack" Mikolajczyk (R, 2023), Martin Quinn (2024) and Douglas Rex (R, 2024).

In July 2022, the Borough Council appointed Michael Conahan to fill the seat expiring in December 2023 that had been held by Amy Flood.

In January 2020, the Borough Council appointed Amy Flood to fill the seat expiring in December 2020 that was vacated by John L. Madden when he took office as mayor.

Until his selection in early 2006 to serve as borough administrator, Ron Dobies had been one of the longest-tenured mayor in New Jersey, with 26 years of service to Middlesex. Dobies left his position as mayor in 2006 and took a position as the borough's administrator. After being fired in 2008, he was successful in his suit against the borough and was restored to his position. In 2011 he ran for mayor again and won a four-year term that ended in 2015.

Federal, state and county representation
Middlesex is located in the 12th Congressional District and is part of New Jersey's 22nd state legislative district.

 

Middlesex County is governed by a Board of County Commissioners, whose seven members are elected at-large on a partisan basis to serve three-year terms of office on a staggered basis, with either two or three seats coming up for election each year as part of the November general election. At an annual reorganization meeting held in January, the board selects from among its members a commissioner director and deputy director. , Middlesex County's Commissioners (with party affiliation, term-end year, and residence listed in parentheses) are 
Commissioner Director Ronald G. Rios (D, Carteret, term as commissioner ends December 31, 2024; term as commissioner director ends 2022),
Commissioner Deputy Director Shanti Narra (D, North Brunswick, term as commissioner ends 2024; term as deputy director ends 2022),
Claribel A. "Clary" Azcona-Barber (D, New Brunswick, 2022),
Charles Kenny (D, Woodbridge Township, 2022),
Leslie Koppel (D, Monroe Township, 2023),
Chanelle Scott McCullum (D, Piscataway, 2024) and 
Charles E. Tomaro (D, Edison, 2023).
Constitutional officers are
County Clerk Nancy Pinkin (D, 2025, East Brunswick),
Sheriff Mildred S. Scott (D, 2022, Piscataway) and 
Surrogate Claribel Cortes (D, 2026; North Brunswick).

Politics

As of March 23, 2011, there were a total of 8,366 registered voters in Middlesex, of which 2,094 (25.0%) were registered as Democrats, 1,605 (19.2%) were registered as Republicans and 4,662 (55.7%) were registered as Unaffiliated. There were 5 voters registered as Libertarians or Greens.

In the 2012 presidential election, Democrat Barack Obama received 50.8% of the vote (2,819 cast), ahead of Republican Mitt Romney with 47.7% (2,645 votes), and other candidates with 1.4% (80 votes), among the 5,587 ballots cast by the borough's 8,481 registered voters (43 ballots were spoiled), for a turnout of 65.9%. In the 2008 presidential election, Republican John McCain received 51.6% of the vote (3,185 cast), ahead of Democrat Barack Obama with 45.9% (2,837 votes) and other candidates with 1.4% (84 votes), among the 6,177 ballots cast by the borough's 8,612 registered voters, for a turnout of 71.7%. In the 2004 presidential election, Republican George W. Bush received 53.0% of the vote (3,202 ballots cast), outpolling Democrat John Kerry with 45.6% (2,755 votes) and other candidates with 0.7% (58 votes), among the 6,040 ballots cast by the borough's 8,376 registered voters, for a turnout percentage of 72.1.

In the 2013 gubernatorial election, Republican Chris Christie received 69.4% of the vote (2,478 cast), ahead of Democrat Barbara Buono with 29.3% (1,045 votes), and other candidates with 1.3% (46 votes), among the 3,617 ballots cast by the borough's 8,552 registered voters (48 ballots were spoiled), for a turnout of 42.3%. In the 2009 gubernatorial election, Republican Chris Christie received 58.2% of the vote (2,410 ballots cast), ahead of  Democrat Jon Corzine with 31.6% (1,307 votes), Independent Chris Daggett with 8.1% (336 votes) and other candidates with 1.1% (46 votes), among the 4,142 ballots cast by the borough's 8,374 registered voters, yielding a 49.5% turnout.

Education

The Middlesex Board of Education serves public school students in pre-kindergarten through twelfth grade. As of the 2020–2021 school year, the district, comprised of five schools, had an enrollment of 2,018 students and 182.2 classroom teachers (on an FTE basis), for a student–teacher ratio of 11.1:1. Schools in the district (with 2020–2021 enrollment data from the National Center for Education Statistics) are
Hazelwood Elementary School with 189 students in grades Pre-K–3, 
Parker Elementary School with 178 students in grades K–3, 
Watchung Elementary School with 256 students in grades K–3, 
Woodland Intermediate School was split off of the middle school starting in 2020–2021, 
Von E. Mauger Middle School with 759 students in grades 4–8 and 
Middlesex High School with 619 students in grades 9–12. The district's superintendent is Dr. Roberta Freeman.

Eighth grade students from all of Middlesex County are eligible to apply to attend the high school programs offered by the Middlesex County Vocational and Technical Schools, a county-wide vocational school district that offers full-time career and technical education at Middlesex County Academy in Edison, the Academy for Allied Health and Biomedical Sciences in Woodbridge Township and at its East Brunswick, Perth Amboy and Piscataway technical high schools, with no tuition charged to students for attendance.

Parks 
There are many parks scattered through Middlesex Boro.

Victor Crowell Park 
Victor Crowell Park, or commonly known as Duck Pond, is a park in the boro that contains, park equipment for kids, a walking trail, and small docks with benches to view the water.

Transportation

Roads and highways

New Jersey Route 28 is the main highway passing through Middlesex. Route 28 provides access to Interstate 287; U.S. Route 22 lies just north of the borough.

Public transportation
NJ Transit provides service to and from the Port Authority Bus Terminal in Midtown Manhattan on the 114 route and to Newark on the 65 and 66 routes.

Notable people

People who were born in, residents of, or otherwise closely associated with Middlesex include:

 Tige Andrews (1920–2007), actor who appeared in The Mod Squad
 Margaret Bourke-White (1904–1971), photo-journalist whose childhood home, the Joseph and Minnie White House at 243 Hazelwood Avenue in the Beechwood Heights section of the town, is listed in the New Jersey Register of Historic Places and the National Register of Historic Places
 Mary Mohler (born 1984), former competition swimmer and former world record-holder in the Women's 200-meter butterfly (long course)
 Rocco Rock (1953–2002), professional wrestler, half of The Public Enemy with Johnny Grunge
 Tom Scharpling (born 1969), host of internet radio show and podcast The Best Show with Tom Scharpling
 Charlie Weis (born 1956), former head coach of the Notre Dame Fighting Irish football team and MHS graduate

References

External links

 Middlesex Borough website
 Middlesex Borough Public Schools
 
 School Data for the Middlesex Board of Education, National Center for Education Statistics
 Middlesex Borough Fire Department
 Middlesex Community Pool

 
1913 establishments in New Jersey
Borough form of New Jersey government
Boroughs in Middlesex County, New Jersey
Populated places established in 1913